Animal Crossing: Happy Home Designer is a 2015 sandbox video game developed and published by Nintendo, with assistance from Monolith Soft, for the Nintendo 3DS. The game was released in Japan in July 2015, in North America in September 2015, and in PAL regions in October 2015. The game is a spin-off of the Animal Crossing series where the player has to design homes for various anthropomorphic animal characters. The game received mixed reviews from critics upon release, praising the creative freedom and improved design controls, but criticizing the lack of challenge, lack of reward, and the game not being DLC for Animal Crossing: New Leaf, and has sold 3.04 million copies worldwide as of March 2016.

A sequel, Happy Home Paradise, was released as DLC for New Horizons on November 5, 2021.

Gameplay 

Animal Crossing: Happy Home Designer downplays the wider community simulation mechanics of the main Animal Crossing series in favor of focusing on house designing; players work as an employee of Nook's Homes, designing homes for other animal villagers based around their suggestions. As players progress, they will unlock additional furniture elements they can incorporate into their designs. Players can also visit the homes they have created.

The game interacts with New Leaf, primarily by allowing the player to unlock exclusive furniture through the Nookling Junction kiosk.

The game integrates with  Animal Crossing Amiibo cards; scanning cards allows their respective character to visit a home that a player had designed, and allows players to design homes for other major characters such as K.K. Slider and Tom Nook.

Development 
Animal Crossing series producer Aya Kyogoku explained that Happy Home Designer was inspired by the internal process of designing homes for the animal villagers in the main Animal Crossing games, stating that "We had to think about, what kind of things would this animal like? What kind of life do they lead? Trying to figure out what they'd want was very fun, and we tried to think of a way we could get this kind of experience to players as well." Players are not tied to a specific budget when designing homes; while the concept was considered, the development team believed that such a limit placed too much of a burden on the player's creativity.

amiibo were also an influence on Happy Home Designer and a sister game, Animal Crossing: Amiibo Festival, as the development team thought that Animal Crossing amiibo would be "cute", and brainstormed new gameplay concepts for the franchise that incorporated them. The two games also have integration with each other; houses designed in Happy Home Designer can appear in-game within amiibo Festival. Eight series character amiibo were planned for release with amiibo Festival.  Upon their announcement, some expressed concerns with the series moving in a different gameplay direction; however Kyogoku noted that it and amiibo Festival were spin-offs, and don't necessarily represent where the mainline series would go in the future.

On October 15, 2021, during an Animal Crossing direct, it was announced that a premium DLC, Animal Crossing: New Horizons: Happy Home Paradise, would be released on November 5, 2021 along with New Horizons's 2.0 update. It is available for $25.00 USD, beginning with pre-orders on October 29. It is also included within the price of the Nintendo Switch Online service's "Expansion Pack". The DLC appears to take heavy inspiration from Happy Home Designer and follows the player making vacation homes for several villagers, as well as establishments such as a school and restaurant. Lottie returns, and two new characters are introduced. In the new DLC, the player can use wallpaper on an individual wall as opposed to only all four, have villagers live with each other, among many other things.

Reception 

The game holds aggregate scores of 66.15% on GameRanking and 66/100 at Metacritic, indicating "mixed or average reviews". IGN's Kallie Plagge praised the game for its "freedom to be creative", but noted that the game sometimes felt unrewarding. Similarly, Nintendo Life felt that the "sheer volume of content was staggering", but was critical of the "lack of any real challenge".

Game Informer's Jeff Cork gave the game a 5 out of 10, saying that it is "a deep dive into Animal Crossing’s ordinarily shallow home-design pool, without the town elements that make the series such a success". GameSpot similarly awarded it a score of 5 out of 10, saying "With what's in the game, Happy Home Designer would have been amazing DLC for New Leaf: it revamps the previous game's clunky design controls, and the glut of new items would give even hardcore fans a reason to revisit their likely neglected village. But as a standalone experience, no matter how many happy homes I design, the town just feels barren."

Sales 
During the game's debut week in Japan, it was the best selling video game in the region, with 522,556 copies sold. As of March 2016, total Japanese sales have surpassed 1.48 million copies, total worldwide sales are at 3.04 million copies.

References

External links 

2015 video games
Animal Crossing video games
Nintendo 3DS games
Nintendo 3DS-only games
Nintendo 3DS eShop games
Nintendo Network games
Video game spin-offs
Video games scored by Kazumi Totaka
Video games developed in Japan
Video games that use Amiibo figurines
Single-player video games